FLANG or Flang may refer to:

 Flang, a project to add Fortran support to LLVM, a compiler infrastructure project.
 Florida Air National Guard (FL ANG), US

See also
 FLAG (chemotherapy), a chemotherapy regimen